Neolaelaps is a genus of mites in the family Laelapidae.

Species
 Neolaelaps magnistigmatus (Vitzthum, 1918)     
 Neolaelaps palpispinosus Strandtmann & Garrett, 1967     
 Neolaelaps spinosus (Berlese, 1910)     
 Neolaelaps vitzthumi Domrow, 1961

References

Laelapidae